Bolboporites is an extinct genus of conical echinoderms that lived in the Ordovician of Europe and North America. They are interpreted to have lived on the seafloor with the pointed end of the cone down in the sediment and the broad end upwards. A single brachiole extended from a hole in this top surface and bent into the current like the arms of crinoids (Rozhnov and Kushlina, 1994). It is likely an eocrinoid which diversified in the Baltic region and then migrated to North America (Rozhnov, 2009).

References
Rozhnov, S.V. 2009. Eocrinoids and paracrinoids of the Baltic Ordovician basin: a biogeographical report. IGCP Meeting, Ordovician palaeogeography and palaeoclimate, Copenhagen, p. 16.

Rozhnov, S.V. and Kushlina, V.B. 1994. Interpretation of new data on Bolboporites Pander, 1830 (Echinodermata; Ordovician), p. 179-180, in David, B., Guille, A., Féral, J.-P. & Roux, M. (eds.), Echinoderms through time (Balkema, Rotterdam).

Blastozoa genera
Ordovician animals
Extinct animals of Europe
Paleozoic life of Ontario
Paleozoic life of Quebec